Jim Williamson (16 June 1926 – December 2005) was an English footballer, who played as an inside forward in the Football League for Tranmere Rovers.

He died in 2005.

References

Tranmere Rovers F.C. players
South Liverpool F.C. players
Association football inside forwards
English Football League players
1926 births
2005 deaths
People from Birkenhead
English footballers